Boronia interrex, commonly known as the Regent River boronia, is a plant in the citrus family, Rutaceae and is endemic to a small area in the Kimberley region of Western Australia. It is an erect, sometimes low-lying shrub with pinnate leaves, cream-coloured to pale pink sepals and pink petals, the sepals longer and wider than the petals.

Description
The eight stamens are hairy with those nearest the petals slightly longer than those near the sepals.

Taxonomy and naming
Boronia interrex was first formally described in 2015 by Russell Barrett, Matthew Barrett and Marco Duretto and the description was published in Nuytsia from a specimen collected in the Prince Regent National Park. The specific epithet (interrex) is a Latin word meaning "a regent" or "temporary king", referring to the type location.

Distribution and habitat
Regent River boronia is only known from a single sandstone mesa in the Prince Regent National Park where it grows with low shrubs including those in the genera Acacia, Grevillea and Triodia.

Conservation
Boronia interrex is classified as "Priority Two" by the Western Australian Government Department of Parks and Wildlife meaning that it is poorly known and from only one or a few locations.

References

interrex
Flora of Western Australia
Plants described in 2015
Taxa named by Russell Lindsay Barrett
Taxa named by Marco Duretto
Taxa named by Matthew David Barrett